Atul Chandra Barua (29 May 1916 – 25 December 2001) was the 46th president of Asam Sahitya Sabha and a prominent name in the modern Assamese literature. He was an ACS officer and an Assamese writer. He worked for the cause of Darrangi culture and was conferred with the title "Darrang Ratna".

Early life

Atul Chandra Barua was born on 29 May 1916 to Bhogram Barua and Pramila Barua in the village Maroigaon (Dubahati) in Darrang district, Assam.

Education

In the year 1924, he was the student from Maroigaon Primary school who topped the Darrang Scholarship exam when he was studying only in class three. He received Khagendra Narayan award when he topped Assam Scholarship Exam and he was studying in Sixth standard of Patharighat High school. He passed his matriculation exam from Mangaldoi Govt. School by holding 1st division and got letter marks in two subjects in the year 1936. In the year 1940, he passed B.A. exam from Cotton College. For further education he went to Calcutta University to acquire M.A. degree. He passed M.A. in 2nd class 1st place in the year 1944.

Personal life
Atul Chandra Barua married Hiran Prabha Barua in the year 1947.

Career

After completing his studies started imparting education to the students in various institutions like Sipajhar High School, Mangaldai High School Patharighat ME School, Kamrup Academy High School (now a senior secondary school), St Mary's College and St Edmund's College in Shillong in Meghalaya (then in Assam) etc. at various times. He also rendered his services in the Assam Secretariat in Shillong from 1943 to 1947. In independent India appearing in the Assam Civil Service Examination held in 1949 for the first lime, he stood second in rank to bag a post of sub-deputy collector.  He was appointed Assistant Deputy Commissioner of Rangia from 1953 to 1958. In 1958, he was appointed P.A. of Commissioner in Shillong i.e. capital of Assam at that time. He was transferred to Tezpur for the post of S.D.O.in 1969 and he work their till 1971. He was also appointed Managing Director of Apex Marketing Society in the year 1971. He worked as M.D. for two years. He was again appointed as Assistant Deputy Commissioner. He worked as A.D.C. for two years. He was retired after that tenure of A.D.C.in the year 1974.

46th President of Asam Sahitya Sabha
In the session of 1979 of Asam Sahitya Sabha Atul Chandra Barua served as the 46th President in Session 1979-80 held in Sualkuchi.

Retirement and afterwards

In bringing fructification the dream project of the Singhapurush Radha Govinda Baruah the Nehru Stadium, Atul Chandra Barua played a pivotal role in the matter of allotment of the plot of Land for the purpose. He was also the moving force behind the establishment of the Ambikagiri Sishu Udyan at Nabagiri Road in Chandmari. 
Besides these Atul Chandra Barua also established the socio-literary organization Mukul Sangha in Shillong which is still standing erect with profound stature in society since its inception in 1945. In 1950, he formed the Jironi Mel its founder secretary; amongst many other organizations. The Guwahati Alochoua Chakra established by him in 1955 is now a very prominent one and holds meetings on a regular basis proffering opportunities to the budding and veteran writers to mingle together to derive mutual benefits. 
In spite of being an extremely busy person with administrative responsibilities of important nature, Atul Chandra Barua could find time enough to write and publish more than 30 books, besides editing about 15 literary and socially relevant journals and magazines including two vernacular dictionaries, of which Chalanta Abhidhan was an achievement of a great order, which was also jointly edited by stalwarts like Dr Maheswar Neog, Kirtinath Hazarika, etc. The first book named ‘Sarad Chandra Goswamir Samu Jiboni’ which was published in the year1946. Some others were ‘Purani Puthir Sadu’(1951), ‘Sahitya Ruprekha’(1957), ‘Ulat-Palat’(1957),  ‘Nabi Katha’(1963), Ojapali, its Different type and Functions (1982).
A lover of his birthplace to the core of his heart, Atul Chandra Barua undertook extensive and intensive research in the field of the culture of Darrang which is termed as 'Darrangi Kala Kristi' and for his yeoman service; he was conferred with the title 'Darrang Ratna'. He dedicated his post-retirement life for the cause of Darrangi culture until he breathed his last. 
An able administrator Atul Chandra Barua could visualize the future of Guwahati city even during the 50s and 60s. He was an advocate for maintenance and preservation of the water-bodies and open spaces in Guwahati, although he could not achieve that cherished desire for reasons galore. Activities that worked opposite to his wishes had become the order of the day, as a consequence of which the agonies of artificial floods have to be faced by the Guwahati denizens as a perennially celebrated festival. Had the same counsel of this visionary been put into action Guwahati today would have been a different place to live in. 
Although the great literary organization Asam Sahitya Sabha has been smeared with black soot by a few black sheep, its stature cannot be diminished by the misdeeds perpetrated by these people. Atul Chandra Barua was elected the president of the Sabha in 1979 at a time when Assam was facing a difficult phase. In the session of 1979 of Asam Sahitya Sabha Atul Chandra Barua served as the 46th President in Session 1979-80 held in Sualkuchi, Atul Chandra Barua as its president played a very significant role to steer the organization for being a savior or Assamese society by protecting and preserving the art, culture, literature and language to stand alone as a unique part of India. Under his able and visionary leadership the Assam Sahitya Sabha also became a great force to be reckoned with in moving the historic six-year-long Assam Agitation spearheaded by the All Assam Students' Union (AASU) to reach the destination successfully. 
During his presidency and afterwards too, Atul Chandra Barua maintained good rapport with the society and various factions of the greater Assamese culture to forge unity amongst all the people of Assam irrespective of caste, culture, creed, religion, ethnicity etc. 
The selflessness of Atul Chandra Barua's personality was the most venerable one and for this aspect only. Prafulla Chandra Barua wrote a cheque in the name of Atul Chandra Barua as donation for the construction of the Lakhiram Barua Sadan in Guwahati. Moreover; his contribution in garnering financial aid for construction of the Radha Nath Handiqui Bhawan at Jorhat is also remembered by everyone. 
The relentless and silent deeds of Atul Chandra Barua for the all-round development of Assam would remain ingrained in public mind for years to come. It is, however, necessary to make the young and the posterior generation aware of the contributions of such a person to inspire them to become conscious citizens to be engaged ill the nation-building process. 
This is the birth centenary year of this beacon. Atul Chandra Barua's life is one to be emulated and we all are in a way duty-bound to be engaged for the well-being of the society following his footsteps.

Literary works
 Sarad Chandra Goswamir Samu Jiboni (1946)
 Purani Puthir Sadu(1951)
 Sahitya Ruprekha(1957)
 Ulat-Palat(1957)
 Nabi Katha(1963)
 Ojapali, its Different type and Functions (1982)

Death
Atul Chandra Barua died on 25 December 2001.

References

External links
 Remembering 'Darrang Ratna' Atul Ch Barua by Dr Roman Sarmah at www.assamtribune.com
 PRESIDENT OF ASSAM SAHITYA SAVA in Session 1979-80  at www.asamsahityasabha.org
 Atul Chandra Baruah recalled at www.sentinelassam.com

1916 births
2001 deaths
Writers from Assam
Assamese-language writers
Asom Sahitya Sabha Presidents
University of Calcutta alumni
People from Darrang district